2009 Nordic Trophy included two tournaments:
 2009 Nordic Trophy (Swedish tournament)
 2009 Nordic Trophy (Finnish tournament)